Ian Malcolm Williams (born 23 September 1963 in Sydney, New South Wales) is an Australian former rugby union player who played as wing.
He played for both Australia and Japan. He is nicknamed Peabody.

Career 
Williams attendeded Epping Boys High School and Cranbrook School in Sydney. Before playing rugby, he played for Australia Under 19 baseball team and won the Combined Associated Schools 100 metres sprint crown with a time of 10.8 seconds. He played for the Australian Schoolboys rugby union team, and was the sprint champion of Combined Associated Schools. He then started his senior career in Eastwood.
His debut against another country was in a match against Fiji, playing for Sydney in 1983. Sydney won the match 38 to 14, with a try scored by Williams. He debuted for the New South Wales representative team against an early-season tour of the All Blacks, where New South Wales suffered a loss of 10 to 37. Williams debuted for the Wallabies in the 1984 tour of the British Isles, where originally he was not part of the Australian squad, but was called up as replacement after Brendan Moon injured an arm during the match against England. Williams played only four matches in the tour, which was known as the Grand Slam Tour, with the Wallabies defeating England, Wales, Scotland and Ireland.

He made his test debut for Australia in the match against Argentina, at Buenos Aires, on 31 October 1987. He last cap for Australia was against New Zealand, in Christchurch, on 21 July 1990, during the 1990 Bledisloe Cup. Williams also played in The Varsity Match for Oxford University, which he also attended before finishing his studies. Later, he moved to Japan, where he played for Kobe Steel, where he was part of the squad of the club's golden age. With Kobe Steel, Williams won six Japan Company Rugby Football Championships and six All-Japan Rugby Football Championships. In 1993, Williams was called up to the Japan team by coach Osamu Koyabu. His only cap for Japan was against Wales, in Cardiff, on 16 October 1993, where after Japan's defeat against Wales for 55–5, he would not be called up again for the national team.

References

External links 
Ian Williams international stats

1963 births
Living people
Rugby union players from Sydney
Australian rugby union players
Japanese rugby union players
Australian expatriate sportspeople in Japan
Rugby union wings
Australia international rugby union players
Japan international rugby union players
Kobelco Kobe Steelers players
Alumni of the University of Oxford
Oxford University RFC players
Australian expatriate sportspeople in England